Kate Harris-Smyth (born 22 September 1972 in Cowra, New South Wales) is an Australian marathon runner. She set her personal best time of 2:28:51, by finishing second at the 2008 Nagano Olympic Commemorative Marathon in Japan.

At age thirty-five, Smyth made her official debut for the 2008 Summer Olympics in Beijing, where she competed in the women's marathon, along with her teammates Benita Johnson and Lisa Weightman. She also ran in the marathon at the 2006 Commonwealth Games, coming in seventh place after collapsing with heat stroke.

References

External links

Profile – Australian Olympic Team
NBC Olympics Profile
- Athlete Sanctuary

Living people
1972 births
People from Cowra
Sportswomen from New South Wales
Australian female marathon runners
Australian female long-distance runners
Olympic athletes of Australia
Athletes (track and field) at the 2008 Summer Olympics
Commonwealth Games competitors for Australia
Athletes (track and field) at the 2006 Commonwealth Games